Mirzaei (also transliterated as Mirzayi, Mirzai, Mirzaie, Mirzayee, or Mirzaee) is a name of Kurdish or Persian origin. It is used as a surname or prefix to identify patriarchal lineage. It is derived from a historical title of Persian origin (Mīrzā), denoting the rank of a high nobleman, royal prince or a scholar.

Notable people with the surname include:

 David Mirzaei (disambiguation), several people

 Musa Mirzaei (disambiguation), several people

 Siroos Mirzaei, Iranian specialist in nuclear medicine

 Mirza Kuchik Khan, Gilan nationalist

Iranian-language surnames